The 2020 United States Senate election in Oregon was held on November 3, 2020, to elect a member of the United States Senate to represent the State of Oregon, concurrently with the 2020 U.S. presidential election, as well as other elections to the United States Senate, elections to the United States House of Representatives and various state and local elections. Incumbent Democratic senator Jeff Merkley won reelection to a third term in office. Although this Senate seat was largely expected to be one of the safest for the Democrats, the race received national attention due to the Republican nominee Jo Rae Perkins's promotion of the unfounded QAnon conspiracy theory. Furthermore, Perkins had flipped five counties that Merkley had won in 2014 (though only by pluralities in the cases of Jackson, Polk and Yamhill).

Democratic primary

Candidates

Nominee
Jeff Merkley, incumbent U.S. Senator (also nominated by the Oregon Independent Party and the Working Families Party)

Withdrawn
Michael David, activist and ethnographer

Endorsements

Results

Republican primary

Candidates

Nominee
Jo Rae Perkins, former chairwoman of the Linn County Republican Party

Eliminated in primary
Paul Romero, refrigeration repair technician and candidate for Oregon's 2nd congressional district in 2016 and 2018
Robert Schwartz, dance teacher
John Verbeek, financial executive and nominee for Oregon's 1st congressional district in 2018

Withdrawn
Matthew Kulow

Declined
Knute Buehler, former state representative for District 54, nominee for Oregon secretary of state in 2012 and Governor of Oregon in 2018 (running for Oregon's 2nd congressional district)

Endorsements

Results

Other candidates

Pacific Green Party

Nominee 
Ibrahim Taher, philosopher, anti-war activist, current member state coordinating committee in the Pacific Green Party (also nominated by the Oregon Progressive Party)

Endorsements

Libertarian Party

Nominee 

 Gary Dye, former refinery operator and engineer

General election

Predictions

Endorsements

Polling

Results

Counties that flipped from Democratic to Republican
 Columbia (largest municipality: St. Helens)
 Coos (largest municipality: Coos Bay)
 Jackson (largest municipality: Medford)
 Polk (largest municipality: West Salem)
 Yamhill (largest municipality: McMinnville)

Notes
 General

References

External links
 
 
  (State affiliate of the U.S. League of Women Voters)
 

Official campaign websites
 Jeff Merkley (D) for Senate
 Jo Rae Perkins (R) for Senate
 Ibrahim Taher (G) for Senate

United States Senate
Oregon
2020